Jach'a Ch'uñu Uma (Aymara jach'a big, ch'uñu dried, frozen potato, uma water, also spelled Jachcha Chuñu Uma) is a mountain in the Bolivian Andes which reaches a height of approximately . It is located in the La Paz Department, Loayza Province, Luribay Municipality. Jach'a Ch'uñu Uma lies north of a river named Ch'uñu Uma.

References 

Mountains of La Paz Department (Bolivia)